, or Hanairo for short, is a Japanese 26-episode anime television series produced by P.A. Works and directed by Masahiro Andō. The screenplay was written by Mari Okada, with original character design by Mel Kishida. P.A. Works produced the project as the studio's tenth anniversary work. The anime aired between April and September 2011 and had two manga adaptations created. An animated film was released in Japanese theaters on March 30, 2013.

Plot
Hanasaku Iroha centers around Ohana Matsumae, a 16-year-old living in Tokyo, who is left in the care of her estranged maternal grandmother, following her mother's elopement with her boyfriend. Ohana arrives at her grandmother's country estate to realize she is the owner of a Taishō period hot spring inn called Kissuisō. She begins working at Kissuisō at her grandmother's request, but finds herself at odds with many employees and customers at the inn. Initially feeling discouraged, she decides to use her circumstances as an opportunity to change herself for the better and to make amends with her deteriorating relationship with the Kissuisō's staff for a more prominent future.

Characters

Ohana is an energetic and optimistic 16-year-old girl and the protagonist of Hanasaku Iroha. She is sent to live at her estranged grandmother's hot spring inn, Kissuisō, after her mother elopes with her boyfriend to evade his debt. Her best friend, Kōichi Tanemura, confessed his feelings to her before her departure, which was left unanswered until later in the series. At her grandmother's demand, she works at the inn as compensation for staying there. After parting with Koichi, she realized that she has feelings for him, though she still hasn't admitted it yet. However, she is always dependent on him. She is a strong willed girl who is stubborn and is realistic for her age. She likes to drink a mix of cola and black tea.

Minko is a 16-year-old apprentice chef and resident at Kissuisō. She is a tsundere, and dislikes Ohana from their first meeting, nicknaming her balut (she pronounces it hobiron ("hột vịt lộn" in Vietnamese for balut)), but has slowly accepted her as a friend. Against her parents' wishes, her dream is to become a professional chef, resulting in her search for training opportunities. Her search led her to Kissuisō, where Tōru Miyagishi accepted her as an apprentice chef. Since then, she has strong feelings for him and becomes jealous when he talks about other girls.

Nako is a shy and timid 16-year-old cleaning part-time maid and waitress at Kissuisō. She has three younger siblings whom she assists her parents in raising. She becomes close friends with Ohana and teaches her how to perform her duties. Nako is very good at swimming, by which she gains since childhood the nickname "Kappapa", after an aquatic mythic creature kappa.

Yuina is the 16-year-old daughter and heiress to the Fukuya Inn, the rival inn of Kissuisō. She is in the same high school as Ohana, Minko, and Nako, and is seen hanging out with them on several occasions. She is divided on the choice of whether to go on with her family's inn-running business, or to find herself a different form of career fulfillment.

Kōichi is a 16-year-old teenager and Ohana's best friend. Kōichi confessed his feelings to Ohana before her departure, but was too afraid to hear her answer and ran away. He often offers support to Ohana when she feels down. He feels abandoned by Ohana as she adjusts to her new lifestyle. However, as the story progresses, he realizes Ohana still harbors feeling for him and eventually tries to repair their relationship.

Ohana's 68-year-old grandmother and owner of Kissuisō. Behind her fierce and strict composure towards her employees (to the point of physically reprimand them), Sui eventually reveals herself as comprehensive and caring toward them when most needed thus earning not only obedience from them, but also respect and devotion.

Tomoe is the 28-year-old head waitress working at Kissuisō. She enjoys hearing gossip about other employees and customers lodging at the inn. As a single woman near her thirties, Tomoe is usually reminded by her mother that she should start looking for a husband and start a family.

Ohana's 32-year-old uncle. He was bullied by Satsuki during their childhood. He often calls upon Takako and considers her his partner. The two marry late in the series. After Kissuisō's closure, Enishi plans to improve his management skills in order to succeed his mother.

A 23-year-old junior chef working at Kissuisō. He is very outspoken and easily frustrated. He strictly mentors and supervises Minko's training, often going too far with verbal abuse. Ohana was initially intimidated by him, but has since developed a dislike to Tōru. However, Tōru appears to develop feelings toward Ohana as he feels that she is the only one who is willing to say she needs him. Afterwards, he is often seen looking out for Ohana, much to Minko's jealousy.

A 42-year-old cook working at Kissuisō. Renji is Tōru's mentor and the head chef of the Kissuisō kitchen. He has a very gruff appearance, evidenced by a small facial scar, but has been shown to have a light-hearted side on occasion. He gets nervous very easily when under pressure, but is usually well-focused on his job.

A 30-year-old business consultant adviser for Kissuisō. She attended the same university as Enishi. She often has erratic plans to improve the inn and tends to spout out random English sayings. She eventually marries Enishi late in the series and takes on his family name as Takako Shijima.

A 31-year-old novelist who frequently lodges at Kissuisō. He writes erotic novels using the Kissuisō's staff as character references. He eventually starts working at the inn after it is discovered that he can't pay his bill. Ironically, his past works include a cooking manga that inspired both Minko and Tōru to become cooks themselves.

A 73-year-old janitor working at Kissuisō. He has been working at Kissuisō since its establishment. The staff call him "Beanman".

Ohana's 38-year-old mother. She is a journalist who elopes with her boyfriend to evade his debt. She leaves Ohana to the care of her mother, who claims to have disowned her daughter. She neglected Ohana as a child and raised her with the mentality of relying on oneself. She works as a hotel and inn critic, often asked to write scathing reviews by her higher ups.

He was Ohana's father, who died when Ohana was a baby. He was a photographer and inspired Satsuki to be an editor.

Media

Manga
A manga adaptation, illustrated by Eito Chida, was serialized between the December 2010 and October 2012 issues of Square Enix's Gangan Joker magazine. Square Enix published five tankōbon volumes between March 22, 2011 and December 22, 2012. A spin-off manga with Minko Tsurugi as the main character, illustrated by Jun Sasameyuki and titled Hanasaku Iroha: Green Girls Graffiti, was serialization in Bandai Visual's online Web Comic Gekkin magazine between July 1, 2011 and July 2, 2012. Two volumes of Green Girls Graffiti were released between December 10, 2011 and July 10, 2012.

Anime

The Hanasaku Iroha 26-episode anime television series is produced by P.A. Works and directed by Masahiro Andō. The series aired in Japan between April 3 and September 25, 2011 on Tokyo MX. The screenplay was written by Mari Okada, and chief animator Kanami Sekiguchi based the character design used in the anime on Mel Kishida's original designs. Sound direction was headed by Jin Aketagawa and the music was produced by Shirō Hamaguchi. The anime series was simulcast in the United States, Canada, the United Kingdom, Ireland, Australia, New Zealand, Sweden, Denmark, Norway, Finland, Iceland, Netherlands, Brazil, and Portugal by the Internet streaming website Crunchyroll. The series has been licensed in North America by NIS America under the title Hanasaku Iroha: Blossoms for Tomorrow. The first Blu-ray/DVD combo pack was released on April 9, 2013 and the second part was released on July 2, 2013. MVM Entertainment acquired distribution rights to the title in the United Kingdom and Ireland.

An anime film titled Hanasaku Iroha: Home Sweet Home was released in Japanese theaters on March 30, 2013, featuring an original storyline. At Anime Expo 2013, NIS America announced the rights to distribute the film in North America.

Music
An image song titled  by Nano Ripe was used for the promotional videos and anime; the single was released on September 22, 2010 by Lantis. Another promotional video featured the image song  by Nano Ripe.

Reception
The series received generally positive reviews. Mania praised Kanae Itō's voice as Ohana, the animation quality, and execution of the plot. The reviewer however commented that the beginning was not new nor innovative. Anime News Network praised the realism and quality in the animation, score, and opening and ending theme music. The character designs were noted to be attractive yet subtle enough to retain the realism, and also noted how Ohana's design is much better than a moe clone. As the characters' personality developed, the reviewer highly praised the realistic interactions between them as they are touching and substantial. Ohana's relationship with her mother and grandmother was noted to be especially well written with daunting emotions. After reviewing the second half of the series, the reviewer considered Hanasaku Iroha to be one of the best titles in 2011. Hanasaku Iroha received a Jury Selection award in the Animation division of the 15th Japan Media Arts Festival.

Yuwaku Bonbori Festival
Hanasaku Iroha also had the effect of attracting fans of the show to visit the Yuwaku Onsen in Kanazawa, Ishikawa, the inspiration for the show's setting. Increased general interest culminates in the Yuwaku Bonbori Festival, held yearly around October. In the anime, the preparation and celebration of the fictional Bonbori Festival was a major plot point. In 2011, shortly after the show finished airing, the town of Yuwaku decided to bring this Festival into reality where there had previously been no equivalent celebration. In addition to typical Japanese festival attractions, the organizers also included a procession of participants carrying paper bonbori lanterns and a burning of ema plaques with participants' wishes written on them, both of which are distinguishing characteristics of the festival as shown in the anime.

During the festival, the town's inns are sold out and attendees number over 15,000 for more recent iterations. Originally, the festival was organized by individuals associated with P.A. Works. More recently, the town has attempted to broaden the appeal of the festival to beyond anime fans, including by inviting traditional musicians.

References

External links
Official website 

2011 anime television series debuts
2010 manga
2011 manga
2013 anime films
Animated films based on animated series
Anime with original screenplays
Coming-of-age anime and manga
Films directed by Masahiro Andō
Gangan Comics manga
Japanese webcomics
P.A.Works
Romantic comedy anime and manga
Films with screenplays by Mari Okada
Seinen manga
Shōnen manga
Slice of life anime and manga
Television shows adapted into films
Television shows written by Mari Okada
Tokyo MX original programming
Webcomics in print